Sheona Wade is the current Solo Horn of Brighouse and Rastrick Band, was the solo tenor horn player of the YBS and Black Dyke Band and Foden's Richardson bands, as well as horn tutor at the University of Salford, where she also gained her BA Hons degree, with Distinction in Performance.

White's previous achievements include playing Principal Horn of the National Youth Brass Band of Scotland, winning the BBC Radio 2 Young Musician of the Year in 1996, and reaching the final of the 1998 Cosmopolitan Magazine Women of Achievement Awards.

Outside the band world, White is most well known for her contribution to the BBC's 1997 charity single, "Perfect Day". White has recorded an album of solos for her chosen instrument, titled The Voice of The Tenor Horn. She previously worked at Lowton High School as a music teacher. She now works at Bolton School Girls Division as a music teacher.

References

External links
article on White at the 4barsrest.com website

Year of birth missing (living people)
English horn players
Alumni of the University of Salford
Living people
Women horn players